Marco Aurélio de Oliveira (born 22 July 1972), commonly known as Marcão, is a Brazilian football manager and former player who played as a defensive midfielder. He is the current assistant manager of Fluminense.

Playing career
Marcão was born in Petrópolis, Rio de Janeiro, and finished his formation with Bangu. He made his first team debut on 5 March 1989, starting in a 0–0 Campeonato Carioca home draw against Americano.

After establishing himself as a starter for the club and subsequently serving loan stints at Criciúma, Vasco da Gama and Bragantino, Marcão joined Fluminense in 1999. At the latter club he was an immediate first-choice, appearing in 333 matches and scoring 12 goals during his first spell.

In August 2005, Marcão moved abroad and joined Al-Ittihad Doha in Qatar. In September, however, he returned to Flu after failing to adapt to the new country, and appeared regularly until the end of 2006, when he was released.

Marcão subsequently represented Cabofriense (two stints), Juventude, Joinville and CFZ do Rio before returning to Bangu in 2009. He retired with the latter club in March 2011, aged 38.

Managerial career
Immediately after retiring Marcão took up coaching, being named manager of his last club Bangu. He was sacked on 30 January 2012, and was appointed at the helm of Bonsucesso on 14 February.

On 26 April 2012, Marcão was announced as the new manager of Ríver, but was sacked with a month in charge. On 12 December of the following year, he returned to Fluminense as an assistant manager.

In March 2016, Marcão was named interim manager of Flu after the dismissal of Eduardo Baptista. He returned to his previous role after the arrival of Levir Culpi, but was again interim after the latter was sacked in November.

Marcão was dismissed from Fluminense on 7 January 2017, and returned to Bangu on 12 July 2018, as a football coordinator. The following 24 June, he returned to his role as an assistant manager, again at Fluminense.

Marcão was interim at Flu for two spells after the departures of Fernando Diniz and Oswaldo de Oliveira. On 4 October 2019, he was definitely appointed manager until the end of the year.

Marcão returned to the assistant role for the 2020 season, but took over the first team on 7 December of that year after Odair Hellmann left the club. He returned to his assistant role on 26 February 2021, after the appointment of Roger Machado as manager.

On 21 August 2021, Marcão was again named manager until the end of the season, after Roger was sacked. He returned to his previous assistant role on 15 December, after Abel Braga was hired by the club.

Managerial statistics

Honours

Player
Fluminense
Campeonato Brasileiro Série C: 1999
Campeonato Carioca: 2002, 2005
Taça Rio: 2005

References

External links

1972 births
Living people
People from Petrópolis
Brazilian footballers
Association football midfielders
Campeonato Brasileiro Série A players
Campeonato Brasileiro Série B players
Campeonato Brasileiro Série C players
Campeonato Brasileiro Série A managers
Bangu Atlético Clube players
Criciúma Esporte Clube players
CR Vasco da Gama players
Clube Atlético Bragantino players
Fluminense FC players
Al-Gharafa SC players
Associação Desportiva Cabofriense players
Esporte Clube Juventude players
Joinville Esporte Clube players
Brazilian football managers
Bangu Atlético Clube managers
Bonsucesso Futebol Clube managers
Ríver Atlético Clube managers
Fluminense FC managers
Sportspeople from Rio de Janeiro (state)